The 1958–59 Allsvenskan was the 25th season of the top division of Swedish handball. 10 teams competed in the league. IK Heim won the league and claimed their third Swedish title. Örebro SK and Lundens BK were relegated.

League table

References 

Swedish handball competitions